MIPS-3D is an extension to the MIPS V instruction set architecture (ISA) that added 13 new instructions for improving the performance of 3D graphics applications. The instructions improved performance by reducing the number of instructions required to implement four common 3D graphics operations: vertex transformation, clipping, transformation and lighting.

For vertex transformation:

 ADDR

For clipping:

 CABS
 BC1ANY2F
 BC1ANY2T
 BC1ANY4F
 BC1ANY4T

For perspective division and normalization:

 RECIP1
 RECIP2
 RSQRT1
 RSQRT2

References 

 Thekkath, Radhika et al. (1999) "An Architecture Extension for Efficient Geometry Processing". Hot Chips Symposium.

SIMD computing
MIPS architecture
MIPS Technologies